Human Head Studios, Inc. was an American video game developer located in Madison, Wisconsin.

History 
Human Head Studios was founded in October 1997 by a group of six developers formerly from Raven Software: Ben Gokey, Chris Rhinehart, Paul MacArthur, Ted Halsted, James Sumwalt, and Shane Gurno—later joined by game producer Tim Gerritsen as co-owner in June 1998. Regarding the origin of the studio's name, Gerritsen explained: "When the guys were thinking of leaving Raven Software, someone posted a message via e-mail that they had lost some money. This started people saying they had lost all sorts of things. One person posted that they had misplaced a bag of human heads and this gave the inspiration for the name." Their first game was Rune, a third-person Viking action game. The company also worked on the long-anticipated first-person shooter Prey, a game that was executive produced by 3D Realms.

On April 20, 2007, a news report indicated that the company's headquarters were partially destroyed in a fire. No injuries were reported. On October 1, 2007, the company moved back into their newly renovated offices. In 2014, Human Head announced that they have revived a multiplayer video game called Minimum from TimeGate Studios, which filed for bankruptcy in 2013. Their final major release was the infamous The Quiet Man, an action-adventure beat-em-up published by Square Enix which features full-motion video cutscenes.

On November 13, 2019, the studio announced its closure, immediately after the release of Rune 2. The whole team subsequently formed a new studio, Roundhouse Studios, under Bethesda Softworks. Chris Rhinehart of Human Head/Roundhouse stated that "Sadly, we had to wind down the business of Human Head Studios and close its doors", but had been able to reach out to Bethesda to establish this new studio.

Games developed

Cancelled 
 Prey 2

References

External links 
Human Head Studios at MobyGames

American companies established in 1997
American companies disestablished in 2019
Companies based in Madison, Wisconsin
Privately held companies based in Wisconsin
Defunct companies based in Wisconsin
Video game companies established in 1997
Video game companies disestablished in 2019
Defunct video game companies of the United States
Video game development companies
1997 establishments in Wisconsin
2019 disestablishments in Wisconsin